Himank, also styled Project HIMANK, is a project of the Border Roads Organisation (BRO) in the Ladakh region of northernmost India that started in August 1985. It is known for constructing some of world's highest motorable roads across the Khardung La, Tanglang La and Chang La passes. Umling la is the highest motorable road on Earth with height 5882 metres (19300 feet). It is responsible for constructing and maintaining motorable roads in Ladakh, along the Line of Actual Control. Himank project ensures access to sensitive military areas including the world's highest battleground at the Siachen Glacier and Pangong Tso Lake (at 4420 metres or 14500 feet), whose waters span the de facto India-China border. Nicknamed "The Mountain Tamers", much of Himank's work is constrained to four months per year, as heavy snow and extreme cold make some roads inaccessible at other times. Between 1987 and 2002, at least 124 Himank personnel were killed while on duty in Ladakh, including five officers. Most of its manual labourers are from Bihar state, not Ladakh. They are nicknamed Dumkas (earlier in the Bihar state and now in the Jharkhand state), where many of the original Himank workers were recruited.

Historical landmarks

 Himank constructed the world's highest 86 km motorable road in Ladakh region, between Chisumle and Demchok villages, passing through Umlingla Top at a height of over 19300 feet.
Himank constructed the world's highest Bailey bridge at Khardung La, though this has been subsequently replaced by a causeway.
Himank's opening of the Srinagar-to -Leh highway in May 1999 was a crucial factor in Operation Vijay allowing India to make a timely military response in the Kargil war.
The Sasoma–Saser La Road will be the "world's first glaciated motorable road" once completed.

Road signs
Project HIMANK is known to post humorous road signs, photos of which are the subject of the book Peep Peep Don't Sleep. Examples include:
I'm curvacious, but please take me slowly.
Better Mr. Late than Late Mr.
Let your insurance policy mature before you.
On the bend go slow friend
Feel the curves / Do not test them
Darling I like you / but not so fast
Safety on road / is “safe tea” / at home
After whisky / driving risky
Don't Gossip Let Him Drive
If you are married, divorce speed
Don't be a Gama in the land of Lama.
Way of worship may be different but GOD is One.

Other Himank signboards, notably those in the Nubra Valley, offer philosophical statements from those as disparate as singer Patti LaBelle, French author Jules Renard, author Jimmy Buffett and early Zionist Jessie Sampter.

See also
Border Roads Organisation
Burma-Shave, also known for humorous road safety signs

References

External links 
HIMANK page on the BRO website
Picture gallery HIMANK
HIMANK road Signs

Government agencies established in 1985
Transport in Ladakh
1985 establishments in Jammu and Kashmir
Border Roads Organisation